Mand Nangal Lubana is a village in Bhulath in Kapurthala District of Punjab State, India. The village is administered by Sarpanch, an elected representative of the village.

Demography 
, the village had a total of six houses and a population of 21 of which 13 are males and eight are females.  According to the report published by Census India in 2011, of the total population of the village zero people are from schedule castes or schedule tribes.

See also
List of villages in India

References

External links 
 Tourism of Punjab
 Census of Punjab

Villages in Kapurthala district